The 1887 Ohio gubernatorial election was held on November 1, 1887. Incumbent Republican Joseph B. Foraker defeated Democratic nominee Thomas E. Powell with 47.73% of the vote.

General election

Candidates
Major party candidates
Joseph B. Foraker, Republican 
Thomas E. Powell, Democratic

Other candidates
Morris Sharp, Prohibition
John J. Seitz, People's

Results

References

1887
Ohio
1887 Ohio elections